Freiermuth may refer to:

Pat Freiermuth (born 1998), American football player
Rico Freiermuth (born 1958), Swiss bobsledder